All Hallows' Eve, known in popular culture as Halloween, is a celebration observed in a number of countries on 31 October, the evening before All Hallows' Day.

All Hallows' Eve may also refer to:

Film and television
 All Hallows' Eve (2013 film), a 2013 horror movie
 All Hallows' Eve (2016 film), a 2016 indie family Halloween film
 "All Hallows Eve", an episode of Suspense and adaptation of "Markheim"

Music
 All Hallows Eve a 2004 EP by Evile
 "All Hallow’s Eve", a 1989 track by Bride from Silence Is Madness
 "All Hallow's Eve", a 2013 series of tracks by John Zorn from On the Torment of Saints, the Casting of Spells and the Evocation of Spirits
 "All Hallows Eve", a 1999 track by Metal band Type O Negative from World Coming Down
 All Hallows' Eve Track Pack, a 2009 track pack for "Guitar Hero 5"

Other media
 All Hallows’ Eve, a 1945 novel by Charles Williams
 All Hallow Eve, a stage play that starred Sophie Gimber Kuhn

See also

 
 All Saints' Day
 All Hallows (disambiguation)
 Allhallows (disambiguation)
 Halloween (disambiguation)